"I Don't Wanna" is a song recorded by American singer Aaliyah. Written and composed by Johntá Austin, Jazze Pha, Donnie Scantz, and Kevin Hicks, it appears on both the Next Friday (1999) and Romeo Must Die (2000) soundtracks.

The song was released in January 2000 as an airplay-only single in the United States, where it reached number 35 on the Billboard Hot 100 and number five on the Hot R&B/Hip-Hop Songs. Internationally, "I Don't Wanna" was released as a double A-side single with "Come Back in One Piece".

Release
"I Don't Wanna" was released as the fourth single from Next Friday by Blackground Records and Priority Records. It was serviced to rhythmic contemporary and urban contemporary radio stations in the United States in January 2000. The song was later released as a double A-side single with "Come Back in One Piece" as the second single from Romeo Must Die by Virgin Records.

In August 2021, it was reported that Aaliyah's recorded work for Blackground (since rebranded as Blackground Records 2.0) would be re-released on physical, digital, and, for the first time, streaming services in a deal between the label and Empire Distribution. Romeo Must Die: The Album, including "I Don't Wanna", was re-released on September 3.

Critical reception
Damien Scott from Complex felt that the song could've blended in well on Aaliyah's second studio album One in a Million (1996). According to Scott, "I Don't Wanna" was "a sullen record that would have fit perfectly on One in a Million, thanks to its somber keys, halted delivery, and abrasive honesty." He also felt that it made for a perfect song for someone going through a break-up. Quentin B. Huff from PopMatters praised the song, saying it showcases "an ode to rekindling love, often in a near-double time delivery", while comparing it to Usher's "Confessions Part II" (2004) and Mariah Carey's "We Belong Together" (2005).

Live performances
To promote Romeo Must Die, Aaliyah performed "I Don't Wanna" on the April 26, 2000 episode of Total Request Live.

Track listing
"I Don't Wanna"/"Come Back in One Piece"
"I Don't Wanna" (album version) – 4:14
"Come Back in One Piece" (no rap) (featuring DMX) – 3:41
"Come Back in One Piece" (featuring DMX) – 4:18
"Come Back in One Piece" (music video) – 3:36

Charts

Weekly charts

Year-end charts

References

Bibliography

External links 
 Official website

1999 songs
2000 singles
Friday (franchise) music
Aaliyah songs
Songs written by Johntá Austin
Songs written by Donnie Scantz
Songs written by Jazze Pha
Blackground Records singles
Virgin Records singles
Contemporary R&B ballads
1990s ballads